R Commander (Rcmdr) is a GUI for the R programming language, licensed under the GNU General Public License, and developed and maintained by John Fox in the sociology department at McMaster University.  Rcmdr looks and works similarly to SPSS GUI by providing a menu of analytic and graphical methods. It also displays the underlying R code that runs each analysis.

Rcmdr can be installed from within R, like any R package. Integration with Microsoft Excel is provided by the RExcel package, which also provides an RAndFriendsLight "bundle" graphical installer. R commander is used as a suggested learning environment for a number of R-centric academic statistics books for students and scientists.

See also
 Comparison of statistical packages
 R interfaces

References

Further reading

External links
Official home page
Rcmdr at CRAN

Free R (programming language) software